Najaf Shahr (formerly, Najafābād and Nejafābād) is a city in the Central District of Sirjan County, Kerman Province, Iran.  At the 2006 census, its population was 6,768, in 1,606 families.

References

Populated places in Sirjan County

Cities in Kerman Province